Sydenham is an inner suburb of Christchurch, New Zealand, two kilometres south of the city centre, on and around the city's main street, Colombo Street. It is a residential, retail and light industrial suburb.

History

While the Sydenham area had seen development from the earliest days of European settlement in Christchurch, it was originally split between the Heathcote and Spreydon road districts instead of being a locality of its own right. The name Sydenham originally referred only to "Sydenham House", a crockery and china shop in the area so named by its owner, Charles Prince, after the north-west Kent town of Sydenham, which is now a London suburb within the London Borough of Lewisham. At a meeting regarding the formation of a borough council for the area, brought on by growth in the area, surveyor and future mayor Charles Allison advocated for the area to be named Sydenham, after the shop. The name was agreed upon, and Sydenham Borough Council came into existence in 1876. The first council and its mayor, George Booth, were elected in 1877. The population of the borough around this time was between five and six thousand, a number which doubled by the end of the 19th century, making it among the largest boroughs in New Zealand at the time.

Sydenham quickly flourished as a suburb. By 1902, the population of the suburb had more than doubled since its formation, making it the largest borough in New Zealand. It had roughly 2500 buildings with a combined value of roughly one million pounds,  of roads, and 95 gas lamps for street lighting. On 31 March 1903, the borough amalgamated with the City of Christchurch and became a suburb. At that time Sydenham already had its own swimming-baths, fire-engine, cemetery and recreation grounds.

The shopping precinct located on Colombo Street was badly affected by the 2010 and 2011 Christchurch earthquakes with many commercial buildings demolished. Approximately 35 sites lost buildings.

The Christchurch City Council produced a master plan in 2012 for redeveloping Sydenham after the earthquakes.

The business district located south of Moorhouse Avenue was nicknamed "SoMo" by Lonely Planet in 2012.

There were around 800 businesses employing 5000 people in Sydenham in 2013. The business precinct had branded itself as "Sydenham Quarter". This marketing campaign was part of the Sydenham master plan.

The Sydenham school site  surrounded by Colombo, Brougham, Buchan and Waverley streets was purchased by the New Zealand Government from the Christchurch City Council for $4.5 million dollars in 2015. This was then sold to Fletchers who built 76 terrace style houses on the site and named the development "350 Colombo".

Geography
Sydenham is located near the centre of Christchurch, and is separated from the central city by the South Island Main Trunk Railway and Moorhouse Avenue. State Highway 76 runs through the middle of Sydenham before connecting to the Christchurch Southern Motorway in the neighbouring suburb of Spreydon to the west. A number of suburbs are located to the south of Sydenham at the base of the Port Hills, including Somerfield, Beckenham and Cashmere. To the east, Sydenham is separated from neighbouring St Martins by the Ōpāwaho / Heathcote River, and from Waltham by Waltham Road.

Demographics
Sydenham comprises four statistical areas. Sydenham Central is almost entirely commercial and light industry. Sydenham West, North and South are primarily residential.

Sydenham Central

Sydenham Central had a population of 138 at the 2018 New Zealand census, an increase of 24 people (21.1%) since the 2013 census, and an increase of 12 people (9.5%) since the 2006 census. There were 57 households. There were 81 males and 60 females, giving a sex ratio of 1.35 males per female. The median age was 30.9 years (compared with 37.4 years nationally), with 15 people (10.9%) aged under 15 years, 48 (34.8%) aged 15 to 29, 72 (52.2%) aged 30 to 64, and 3 (2.2%) aged 65 or older.

Ethnicities were 67.4% European/Pākehā, 13.0% Māori, 2.2% Pacific peoples, 21.7% Asian, and 2.2% other ethnicities (totals add to more than 100% since people could identify with multiple ethnicities).

The proportion of people born overseas was 34.8%, compared with 27.1% nationally.

Although some people objected to giving their religion, 50.0% had no religion, 32.6% were Christian, 2.2% were Buddhist and 4.3% had other religions.

Of those at least 15 years old, 27 (22.0%) people had a bachelor or higher degree, and 6 (4.9%) people had no formal qualifications. The median income was $42,100, compared with $31,800 nationally. The employment status of those at least 15 was that 93 (75.6%) people were employed full-time, 9 (7.3%) were part-time, and 3 (2.4%) were unemployed.

Residential areas

The residential areas of Sydenham cover .

The residential areas had a population of 6,105 at the 2018 New Zealand census, an increase of 549 people (9.9%) since the 2013 census, and an increase of 948 people (18.4%) since the 2006 census. There were 2,583 households. There were 3,057 males and 3,045 females, giving a sex ratio of 1.0 males per female, with 810 people (13.3%) aged under 15 years, 1,659 (27.2%) aged 15 to 29, 2,721 (44.6%) aged 30 to 64, and 909 (14.9%) aged 65 or older.

Ethnicities were 74.2% European/Pākehā, 9.0% Māori, 4.4% Pacific peoples, 17.4% Asian, and 3.3% other ethnicities (totals add to more than 100% since people could identify with multiple ethnicities).

The proportion of people born overseas was 31.6%, compared with 27.1% nationally.

Although some people objected to giving their religion, 49.1% had no religion, 35.1% were Christian, 3.8% were Hindu, 1.0% were Muslim, 1.3% were Buddhist and 4.3% had other religions.

Of those at least 15 years old, 1,371 (25.9%) people had a bachelor or higher degree, and 816 (15.4%) people had no formal qualifications. The employment status of those at least 15 was that 2,838 (53.6%) people were employed full-time, 669 (12.6%) were part-time, and 204 (3.9%) were unemployed.

Economy

The Colombo

The Colombo shopping centre is a shopping centre in Sydenham. It has 44 tenants, including the Academy Gold Cinema. In July 2020, Christchurch-based retail chain Smiths City moved its flagship store to The Colombo centre.

Restaurants 
There are many restaurants and takeaway food establishments on Colombo Street.

Art district 
There is a vibrant art district in Sydenham with at least five art galleries located in Sydenham. These include Chambers Art Gallery, Jonathan Smart Gallery, Fiksate Studio & Gallery, Form Gallery, City Art Depot,  and NZ Art Broker. Buildings feature street art works and many public art events have been held in Sydenham. As part of the Sydenham master plan, artwork was installed on Colombo street as a gateway into Sydenham.

Light industry 
North of Brougham Street, there are many light industrial businesses located in Sydenham.

Education 
Sydenham School, on the corner of Brougham and Colombo Streets, was first opened in 1872 and known as Colombo Road School. The land cost one  hundred pounds to purchase and a further 862 pounds to build the school.  By March 1873, there were almost 400 children enrolled. The school was renamed Sydenham school in 1880. At one stage it was the largest school in New Zealand. The school was closed in December 2000.

In 2021, There were no primary or secondary schools within the suburb of Sydenham. Somerfield School takes students to the west of Colombo Street and south of Brougham Street. Waltham School takes students to the east of Colombo Street and south of Moorhouse Avenue. Addington School takes students to the west of Colombo Street and to the north of Somerfield school's zone. Beckenham School takes students to the east of Colombo Street and south of King and Huxley Streets.

Heritage buildings
Sydenham has a number of heritage buildings registered by Heritage New Zealand, with some already lost or to be lost due to the February 2011 Christchurch earthquake.  The New Zealand Loan and Mercantile Woolstore in Durham Street is the only Category I heritage building. Coming from the south, the Sydenham Post Office and the Sydenham Heritage Church formed an entry into the strip shopping area along Colombo Street, but the church was controversially demolished shortly after the February earthquake.

Nazareth House Chapel is located west of Sydenham Park and belongs to a retirement village.  Blackheath Place are residential brick terrace houses that are rather uncommon in New Zealand.  Three registered cottages are located in Shelley and Tennyson Streets.

Sporting teams

Sydenham Park is public open space that also acts as the home ground for Sydenham Cricket Club, Sydenham Hockey Club and Sydenham Rugby Club. All three clubs have provided players for their respective New Zealand teams. These including Stephen Fleming for cricket, John Radovonich for hockey and Charlie Oliver for rugby union. Ben Stokes, the English cricketer spent time in 2020 working with the Sydenham Cricket Club.

Christchurch South Police station 

The Christchurch South Police Station is located on Colombo Street in Beckenham. The previous police station for Sydenham was in Stanley Street, and was replaced by the Christchurch South station. It was opened in 2009 by the minister of police Judith Collins. The building cost $7.5 million to build.

References

Suburbs of Christchurch